Henry Holden (1596–1662) was an English theologian.

Henry Holden may also refer to:

 Henry Holden (police officer) (1823–1900), English chief constable and cricketer
 H. J. Holden (1859–1926), Australian businessman
 Henry Smith Holden (1887–1963), British botanist

See also
Harry Holden (disambiguation)